Caribbean Cinemas  is a chain of movie theaters in Puerto Rico and the Caribbean. It is the only major chain in Puerto Rico following CineVista's bankruptcy. The chain has expanded into Dominican Republic, Panama, St. Thomas, St. Croix, St. Maarten, St. Kitts, St. Lucia, Antigua, Aruba,  Trinidad and Tobago, Guyana and Guadeloupe.

History and expansion
In 2005, Caribbean Cinemas bought the second floor CineVista location at Plaza Las Américas after it was closed by the latter company; reopening under the Caribbean Cinemas brand as the largest of the chain, with 17 theater halls. In 2007, CineVista also closed its location on the second floor of Plaza del Norte before declaring bankruptcy and ultimately going out of business; Caribbean Cinemas also opted to buy out the empty space five years later and reopened as Caribbean Cinemas in May 2012 with 5 theater halls and one in 3D. In October 2016, Caribbean Cinemas announced that a new location, and its first premium format, dubbed Caribbean Cinemas VIP, would be built in the Puerto Rico Convention Center District, with seven theater halls, and one in premium large format. On June 19, 2019, Caribbean Cinemas celebrated its 50th anniversary by offering all movie screenings at opening day prices that day only.

Digital 3D
In February 2009, Caribbean Cinemas debuted its first digital 3D theater with Jonas Brothers: The 3D Concert Experience at Plaza las Américas. Over the years, more digital 3D films have been projected in most locations with at least one theater hall optimized for it.

Premium large format
In December 2014, Caribbean Cinemas opened its first premium large format theater hall, dubbed Caribbean Cinemas Extreme (CXC), at Las Catalinas Mall, a premium large screen reserved seating theater format. It utilizes a 4K projector and employs Dolby Atmos sound system, transmitting 128 audio channels and over 30,000 watts of power to over 60 speakers located throughout the hall for a 360° sound. In the following months, four more theater halls have been converted in locations at Plaza las Américas, Plaza del Caribe, Plaza Guaynabo and Barceloneta. Montehiedra was added a CXC after its major renovation in 2016, making it the fifth large format screen of the company.

IMAX and 4DX

In February 2016, Caribbean Cinemas announced the arrival of the first IMAX and 4DX theaters to the Montehiedra location, which meant it had to undergo a complete renovation. As part of plans, a second floor was to be constructed for the IMAX theater, meaning that of the 14 halls it has always had since 1996, two had to be merged to meet the standards of an IMAX theater to accommodate up to 400 people. Another renovation to the Montehiedra location is the first 4DX theater hall in Puerto Rico with synchronized motion seats, and special effects such as strobe lightning, mists, wind and bubbles. In May 2016, Caribbean Cinemas announced that AT&T and Toyota would be the corporate sponsors to the IMAX and 4DX theaters, respectively, upon their opening at Montehiedra Cinemas. It reopened in June 2016 debuting the first IMAX and 4DX halls in Puerto Rico.

The Caribbean Cinemas theater at Plaza Carolina also underwent renovations to make way for the second theater of the chain to have 4DX and IMAX, announced in August 2018, and opened in November that same year.

See also
 List of cinema and movie theater chains

References

External links
 Caribbean Cinemas Official Site
 Guadeloupe Caribbean Cinemas Official Site

Entertainment companies of Puerto Rico
Cinema chains in Trinidad and Tobago
Cinemas and movie theaters chains
Movie theatre chains in the United States
Cinemas and movie theaters in Puerto Rico